Gábor Tóth (born 26 March 1987) is a Hungarian football player who plays for Szeged-Csanád.

Club statistics

Updated to games played as of 6 December 2014.

References
MLSZ
Lombard FC Papa Official Website

1987 births
Living people
People from Kiskunhalas
Hungarian footballers
Association football midfielders
Dunaújváros FC players
Lombard-Pápa TFC footballers
Szeged-Csanád Grosics Akadémia footballers
Nemzeti Bajnokság I players
Nemzeti Bajnokság II players
Nemzeti Bajnokság III players
Sportspeople from Bács-Kiskun County